Edward Jones is an American producer and visual effects artist. He won an Academy Award in the category Best Visual Effects for the film Who Framed Roger Rabbit.

Selected filmography 
 Who Framed Roger Rabbit (1988; co-won with Ken Ralston, Richard Williams and George Gibbs)

References

External links 

Living people
Place of birth missing (living people)
Year of birth missing (living people)
Visual effects artists
Visual effects supervisors
Best Visual Effects Academy Award winners
American film producers